Li Yanxi (born June 26, 1984 in Shijiazhuang, Hebei) is a Chinese triple jumper.

He won the silver medal at the 2002 World Junior Championships, finished fourth at the 2006 IAAF World Cup and won the 2006 Asian Games.

His personal best jump is 17.59 metres, also the current Asian record, achieved in the 11th Chinese National Games in Jinan.

Competition record

References

1984 births
Living people
Athletes (track and field) at the 2004 Summer Olympics
Athletes (track and field) at the 2008 Summer Olympics
Chinese male triple jumpers
Olympic athletes of China
Sportspeople from Shijiazhuang
Asian Games medalists in athletics (track and field)
Athletes from Hebei
Athletes (track and field) at the 2006 Asian Games
Athletes (track and field) at the 2010 Asian Games
Asian Games gold medalists for China
Medalists at the 2006 Asian Games
Medalists at the 2010 Asian Games
Competitors at the 2003 Summer Universiade